Jan van Glabbeeck (c. 1635, El Puerto de Santa María – 1686) was a Dutch painter and art dealer.

He was a pupil of Rembrandt and was very active in Amsterdam and Utrecht.

Notes and references 

  Bénézit, 1976
 

1635 births
1686 deaths
Dutch art dealers
17th-century Dutch painters
Pupils of Rembrandt